The True North is a Canadian documentary television miniseries which aired on CBC Television in 1967.

Premise
The series featured documentaries concerning the Canadian Arctic with its environment and inhabitants. It was developed as a Canadian Centennial project.

Scheduling
This half-hour series was broadcast on Thursdays at 10:30 p.m. (Eastern) from 14 September to 23 November 1967.

Episodes

References

External links
 

CBC Television original programming
1967 Canadian television series debuts
1967 Canadian television series endings
1960s Canadian documentary television series